The  is an annual marathon sporting event in Kumamoto City, Kumamoto Prefecture, Japan. It is held in commemoration of the Kumamoto becoming an ordinance-designated city on April 1, 2012. The first running of the event took place on February 19, 2012. The race will take place for the second time on February 17, 2013.

References

External links 
 

Marathons in Japan
Sport in Kumamoto Prefecture
Recurring sporting events established in 2012
2012 establishments in Japan
Kumamoto